Robert Maynard Hardy  (5 October 19369 April 2021) was an Anglican bishop in the Church of England.

Early life
Hardy was born on 5 October 1936. He was educated at Queen Elizabeth Grammar School, Wakefield and Clare College, Cambridge.

Career
Hardy trained for ordination at Cuddesdon College, and was ordained deacon in 1962 and priest in 1963. His first position was at All Saints and Martyrs' Church, Langley, Manchester, after which he became a chaplain (and fellow) of Selwyn College, Cambridge. Following this he was appointed Vicar of Borehamwood then Director of the St Albans Diocese Ministerial Training Scheme. In 1980 he was ordained to the episcopate as the Bishop of Maidstone. In 1987 he was translated to be the Bishop of Lincoln. He retired in 2001, resigning his See effective 31 October. He also served as Bishop to HM Prisons, 1985–2001.

Later life
In retirement, from 2001, he continued to serve as an honorary assistant bishop in the Diocese of Carlisle, while living at Langwathby, Cumbria.

On 16 June 2001, as part of that year's Queen's Birthday Honours, he was appointed a Commander of the Order of the British Empire "for services to the Church of England, and to Prisoners".

References

1936 births
2021 deaths
People from Wakefield
Alumni of Clare College, Cambridge
Fellows of Selwyn College, Cambridge
Alumni of Cuddesdon College
Bishops of Maidstone
Bishops to HM Prisons
Bishops of Lincoln
20th-century Church of England bishops
Commanders of the Order of the British Empire
People educated at Queen Elizabeth Grammar School, Wakefield
21st-century Church of England bishops